Digitivalva artemisiella is a moth of the family Acrolepiidae. It is found in Japan.

The wingspan is 8–11 mm.

References

Acrolepiidae
Moths described in 1972
Moths of Japan